Fathom  is a 1967 British spy comedy film directed by Leslie H. Martinson, starring Raquel Welch and Anthony Franciosa.

Fathom Harvill (Welch) is a skydiver touring Europe with a U.S. parachute team, who becomes caught up in a deadly competition between competing forces. The film was based on Larry Forrester's second Fathom novel Fathom Heavensent, then in the draft stage but never published. His first was 1967's A Girl Called Fathom.

This was one of three 1967 20th Century Fox films about female spies, the others being Doris Day's Caprice and Andrea Dromm's Come Spy with Me.

Writer Lorenzo Semple said "It could have been very good. It's so confused. I watched it a couple of times, and I really didn’t know what was gonna happen! I didn't know who done it or what they'd done!"

Plot
Fathom Harvill, a female skydiver, is in Spain with a U.S. parachute team. She accepts a lift from a man called Timothy and is taken to see Douglas Campbell, who convinces her that he is a British agent working for NATO and wants Fathom to help him find a triggering mechanism for a nuclear weapon that has gone missing in the Mediterranean. He tells her that the device is hidden inside an ancient Chinese figurine known as the Fire Dragon. Following Campbell's plan, Fathom skydives into the villa of a man, Peter Merriwether, who has a Chinese assistant, Jo-May Soon, and is also searching for the figurine, but she finds a dead body and is caught by Merriwether who accuses her of the murder.

Fathom eventually convinces Merriwether that she is innocent, and he tells her that the nuclear weapon story was a ruse and the Fire Dragon was stolen from a Far East museum by a Korean War deserter who is now being tracked by Merriwether, who is a private investigator, and he says Campbell is the deserter. Also in hot pursuit of the figurine is an Armenian man named Serapkin who is a rich private collector and wants it for himself.

After fending off a knife attack and another from a harpoon, Fathom chances upon the figurine in her makeup case. Campbell now convinces her that he is the trustworthy one and Merriwether the deserter, and Fathom boards a plane with him and Timothy, but they promptly attempt to toss her from it with a defective parachute. Merriwether catches up with them in another plane and the two pilots have a duel in the air, trying to force the other down into the sea. Merriwether manages to shoot Campbell dead and when Timothy produces a gun, Fathom fights him for it, leading to Timothy falling out of the plane. Now revealed as the good guy, Merriwether, with the leverage of Fathom's passport which he has, persuades her--after she passes over the villa and tosses the Fire Dragon down to Jo-May Soon to return it to China--to meet him later in a bar.

Cast
As appearing in screen credits (main roles identified):

Production

Development
The film was made by 20th Century Fox to cash in on the success of the Modesty Blaise comic strip and film. It was written by Lorenzo Semple Jr and directed by Leslie Martinson who had just made the film of the TV show Batman. Semple says the studio were attracted by the fact that he and Martinson had made Batman so quickly and cheaply.

Semple said "Fox bought a novel called FATHOM, about a big, tall girl. She was called Fathom because she was six feet tall. They thought that would be their Modesty 
Blaise."

He wrote the script in Boris Karloff's old house. Semple wrote the first twenty pages "making it up as I went along... I made every page exciting".

Semple says he sent the first twenty pages to Fox and David Brown and Richard Zanuck liked it. They gave it to John Koch, who they wanted to produce. Koch insisted on writing the script with Semple line by line.

The lead was given to Raquel Welch. She was a 20th Century Fox contractee who had leapt to fame with Fantastic Voyage and One Million Years B.C.. This inspired Fox to give her her first starring vehicle.

Semple recalled "The movie MODESTY BLAISE came out and it was a spectacular flop. 
So that cooled off the whole project, they were stuck with it."

Shooting
Filming started September 1966. It was shot in Cártama, Mijas, Málaga, Torremolinos, Nerja, in Andalucía, Spain and Shepperton Studios, Shepperton, Surrey, England. Semple says that Welch and Martinson had a fight on the first day of filming and never spoke throughout the rest of the shoot.

Semple also said "Franco was still in command then, there were a lot of things in the script they didn't like, so a lot of the script was thrown away on the  first days shooting."

Second unit director Peter Medak later said of working with Welch:
She was at that time quite inexperienced, exactly like one of those American drum majorettes. But she tried very hard and went to see the rushes each day, gradually improving. 'Who's this dumb broad?' people used to say. But I said: 'You wait. I'll bet she made it.' I liked her very much because she was such a genuine person. And she had a beautiful body which always helps.
"I played a blown up Barbie doll", said Welch later. "I have never appeared completely nude but I don't condemn people who do."

Shortly after filming ended Welch announced she would marry her manager, Patrick Curtis.

Music
All the film's musical score was composed by John Dankworth. An official soundtrack was released in 1967 in the United States by 
20th Century Fox Records and Stateside Records in the U.K. on an 11-track vinyl. It was reissued on CD by Harkit Records as a twelve track in 2009.

Release
The film was released in the United States on 9 August and in the United Kingdom on 1 October 1967. The U.K. theatrical release was cut with the British Board of Film Classification giving a U (Universal) Suitable for all rating.

Reception

Box office
According to Fox records, the film needed to earn $3,875,000 in rentals to break even and made $3,295,000, meaning it made a loss. Semple says it was "meant to be a series, but it was killed."

Critical response
The Los Angeles Times film critic said that "each new Raquel Welch picture brings further proof that when Maria Montez died they didn't break the mold. Like Maria, Raquel can't act from here to there, but both ladies seem to have been born to be photographed... this sappiest of spy pictures." On the other hand, the New York Times called it "crackling good fun" and said, "Somewhere between her unfortunate arrival in the revival of 'One Million Years B.C.' and the new film...Miss Welch has learned to act."

See also
List of American films of 1967

References

External links
 
 
 
 
Film review by Roger Ebert

1967 films
American action comedy films
British action comedy films
American spy comedy films
British spy comedy films
Films directed by Leslie H. Martinson
Films with screenplays by Lorenzo Semple Jr.
Films based on British novels
1960s spy comedy films
20th Century Fox films
Skydiving in fiction
Films set in the Mediterranean Sea
Films set in Spain
Girls with guns films
1960s action comedy films
1967 comedy films
Films scored by John Dankworth
Parody films based on James Bond films
1960s English-language films
1960s American films